The Karelian Bobtail is a breed of cat that originated in the Lake Ladoga region of the Republic of Karelia, Russia.

History
The breed was first recognised by the World Cat Federation in 1994.

Characteristics
Karelian Bobtails can be either short-haired or long-haired. The tail varies from 4 to 13 cm in length, and has longer hair than that of the body. Unlike similar breeds such as the Kurilian Bobtail, the bobbed tail is recessive. All colours except cinnamon, chocolate, fawn and lilac are acceptable; all patterns are acceptable also except for colorpointing. The Karelian Bobtail has a soft undercoat and a glossy and thick top coat.

References

Cat breeds originating in Russia
Cat breeds